George Willoughby may refer to:
 George Willoughby (activist) (1914–2010), American Quaker activist
 Sir George Willoughby (MP) (c. 1635–1695), English MP for Marlborough, 1685–1695
 George Willoughby, 7th Baron Willoughby of Parham (1638–1674), English peer
 George Willoughby, 17th Baron Willoughby of Parham (1748/9–1779), English peer
 George Willoughby (soldier) (1828–1857), British soldier in India
 George Willoughby (theatre entrepreneur) (1869–1951), English theatre entrepreneur